Buffalo Woman Lake is located in Glacier National Park, in the U. S. state of Montana.

The name, Buffalo Woman Lake, was officially approved by the United States Geographic Board (now known as the United States Board on Geographic Names) on March 6, 1929. The name Buffalo Woman was recommended by Howard A. Noble, General Manager of the Glacier Park Hotel, and approved by the National Park Service.  According to the Geographic Board's decision card, the name is associated with the Native American tribe known as the Blackfeet.

See also
List of lakes in Flathead County, Montana (A-L)
Beaver Woman Lake
Mount Pinchot (Montana)
Mount Saint Nicholas

References

Lakes of Glacier National Park (U.S.)
Lakes of Flathead County, Montana